South Hall may refer to:
 South Hall, a building at the University of California, Santa Barbara
 South Hall (UC Berkeley), the oldest building at the University of California, Berkeley
 South Hall, River Falls State Normal School, the oldest building of the University of Wisconsin-River Falls
 South Hall, a residence hall at The George Washington University
 South Hall, a dorm at Tufts University
 South Hall, a building at the Tennessee Technological University
 South Hall (1898), a former building at the University of Arizona in Tucson, Arizona designed by Henry C. Trost (demolished 1958)

See also
Southall, London

Architectural disambiguation pages